Debs v. United States, 249 U.S. 211 (1919), was a United States Supreme Court decision, relevant for US labor law and constitutional law, that upheld the Espionage Act of 1917.

Facts

Eugene V. Debs was an American labor and political leader and five-time Socialist Party of America candidate for the American Presidency. On June 16, 1918 Debs made an anti-war speech in Canton, Ohio, protesting US involvement in World War I. He was arrested under the Espionage Act of 1917 and convicted, sentenced to serve ten years in prison and to be disenfranchised for life.

The case against Debs was based on a document entitled Anti-War Proclamation and Program, showing that Debs' original intent was to openly protest against the war. The argument of the Federal Government was that Debs was attempting to arouse mutiny and treason by preventing the drafting of soldiers into the United States Army. This type of speech was outlawed in the United States with the Espionage Act of June 15, 1917. The defense argued that Debs was entitled to the rights of free speech provided for in the first amendment of the Bill of Rights. This was one of three cases decided in 1919 in which the Court had upheld convictions that restricted free speech.

Judgement

In its ruling on Debs v. United States, the Court examined several statements that Debs had made regarding the war. While he had tempered his speeches in an attempt to comply with the Espionage Act, the Court found he had shown the "intention and effect of obstructing the draft and recruitment for the war." Among other things, the Court cited Debs' praise for those imprisoned for obstructing the draft. In his opinion, Justice Oliver Wendell Holmes, Jr. stated that Debs' case was essentially the same as Schenck v. United States (1919), in which the Court upheld a similar conviction. The Supreme Court decided against Debs, and maintained the power of the Espionage Act. Debs' sentence to ten years imprisonment and loss of citizenship was upheld. Holmes J said the following:

Significance
Debs went to prison on April 13, 1919. While in federal prison, he was nominated for president by the Socialist Party of America in the 1920 Election for the fifth and final time despite his disfranchisement. He received 919,799 votes (3.4% of the popular vote), the most ever for a Socialist Party presidential candidate in the U.S. It was slightly more than his 900,672 total in the 1912 election, which had equaled six percent of the popular vote. (National women's suffrage in 1920 greatly increased the total number of votes cast.)

In 1921, Congress largely repealed the Espionage and Sedition Acts. On December 23, 1921 President Warren G. Harding commuted Debs' sentence to time served, effective Christmas Day. He did not issue a pardon. The two met the following day at the White House.

See also
 United States labor law
 In re Debs
 List of United States Supreme Court cases, volume 249
 Inherent powers

Notes

External links
 
 
 Appellate record and case briefs for Debs v. United States

1919 in United States case law
United States Supreme Court cases
United States Free Speech Clause case law
History of the Socialist Party of America
Opposition to World War I
United States military case law
United States Supreme Court cases of the White Court
United States home front during World War I
Eugene V. Debs